Maria Luisa Zubizarreta is professor emerita of linguistics at the University of Southern California, where she held a position beginning in 1988.

Education and personal life 
Zubizarreta was born and raised in Asunción, Paraguay. She obtained her Maîtrise in General Linguistics from Paris 8 University in 1978 and her PhD in Linguistics from the Massachusetts Institute of Technology in 1982, with a dissertation entitled On the Relationship of the Lexicon to Syntax.

She was married to fellow linguist, Jean-Roger Vergnaud.

Research 
Zubizarreta has conducted her research within the framework of generative linguistics. More precisely, she is interested in linguistic theory as a model of mental competence and performance. Her approach is comparative and considers interface issues ranging from the relation between the lexicon and syntax (Zubizarreta 1987) to the prosody and syntax of focus (Zubizarreta 1998).

Zubizarreta has conducted empirical research into issues dealing with second language acquisition, focusing on the mental grammar of the learners as they develop interlanguage (Zubizarreta & Nava 2011). Her work has also explored person-related phenomena from a semantic perspective in different languages, including the use of person features in Paraguayan Guaraní (Zubizarreta & Pancheva 2017a, b).

Honors 
A workshop, entitled Person and Perspective, and a related Festschrift were organized in her honor in 2019. The Festschrift, published by Cambridge University Press, is entitled Exploring Interfaces.

Selected publications 

 On the Syntactic Composition of Manner and Motion. Linguistic Monograph Series, MIT Press,(ML Zubizarreta & E. Oh). 2007. 
 Prosody, Focus, and Word Order, MIT Press. 1998. 
 Levels of Representation in the Lexicon and in the Syntax, Foris Publications, 1987. Reprinted Mouton 2019. 
Encoding discourse-based meaning: Prosody vs. syntax. Implications for second language acquisition. (ML Zubizarreta & E. Nava). Lingua 121 [2011], 652-669. 
A note on the syntax of possession in Paraguayan Guaraní. (ML Zubizarreta & R. Pancheva). In Boundaries, Phases and Interfaces. Benjamins, 2017a. 
A formal characterization of person-based alignment: The case of Paraguayan Guaraní. (ML Zubizarreta & R. Pancheva). Natural Language & Linguistic Theory, 35 [2017b], 1161–1204.

References

External links 

 Maria Luisa Zubizarreta's CV

Women linguists
Linguists from Paraguay
MIT School of Humanities, Arts, and Social Sciences alumni
University of Southern California faculty
Paris 8 University Vincennes-Saint-Denis alumni
Year of birth missing (living people)
Living people